The impossible wheel, also known as the BC wheel (after the comic strip B.C.), represents the most basic type of unicycle, consisting of a single, spoked wheel with pegs extending from the axle. The rider mounts the wheel by jumping onto the pegs while in motion or by putting one foot onto one plate or peg and pushing along like a skateboard.

This device has no drivetrain, so when forward inertia runs out due to gravity and friction, the ride ends. Newer BC wheels use plates which hang below the axle instead of pegs in line with the axle. This makes them easier to ride since the center of gravity is lower.  

The unicycling community favors the term BC wheel because the device is not actually impossible to ride; proficiency can be gained with a few hours of practice. Tricks, such as hopping, drops, grinds, and spins, are possible.

Ultimate wheel

An ultimate wheel is a wheel with two pedals directly connected – similar to a unicycle and impossible wheel. It has no seat or frame but offset and functional pedals. There are several different designs: the most popular involves a solid or semi-solid disk inside a regular small bicycle wheel rim with the pedals attached directly to the disk. A less common style uses metal cross braces instead of wood.

Some mounting and riding techniques include:

 Regular mount – have one pedal lower than the other and step up to the other pedal 
 Free jump mount – release the wheel then jump onto the pedals
 Standard riding – simply being able to ride without falling off 
 Turning – turning by twisting your body and the wheel
 Bunny hop – grabbing on the wheel and hopping off the ground 
 Idling – remaining in one place with one pedal down and one pedal up, rocking the wheel back and forth to keep balance
 Reverse – riding the wheel backwards

See also
Monowheel

References

External links

Impossible wheel
 BC Wheel on Wikibooks Unicyclopedia (Encyclopedia of Unicycling)
 BC Wheel videos at unicyclist.org
 Riding the Impossible Wheel including photos
 BC Wheel video on YouTube

Ultimate wheel
Ultimate Wheel Tricks page in the Unicyclopedia.
Ultimate Wheel page on unicycling.org
Ultimate Wheels on unicycling.com

Unicycling
Wheels